The 1957 Penn Quakers football team was an American football team that represented the University of Pennsylvania as a member of the Ivy League during the 1957 NCAA University Division football season. 

In their fourth year under head coach Steve Sebo, the Quakers compiled a 3–6 record and were outscored 138 to 121. David Weixelbaum and Peter Keblish were the team captains.

Penn's 3–4 conference record tied for fourth place in the Ivy League. The Quakers outscored their Ivy opponents 100 to 84.

Penn played its home games at Franklin Field adjacent to the university's campus in Philadelphia, Pennsylvania.

Schedule

References

Penn
Penn Quakers football seasons
Penn Quakers football